Kadagathur  is a village panchayath under Dharmapuri Block and in Dharmapuri district in the state of Tamil Nadu, India. This village is located 6 km away from District Capital Dharamapuri.

See also
 Queen of Angels Church, Kadagathur
 Dharmapuri taluk

References

Villages in Dharmapuri district